Fairfield is the county seat of and the only village in Camas County, Idaho. The population was 410 at the time of 2010 census, nearly half of the rural county's population.

Geography

Climate

According to the Köppen Climate Classification system, Fairfield has a warm-summer mediterranean continental climate, abbreviated "Dsb" on climate maps.

Demographics

2010 census
As of the census of 2010, there were 416 people, 176 households, and 109 families residing in the city. The racial makeup of the city was 93.0% White, 1.0% Native American, 0.2% Asian, 1.4% from other races, and 4.3% from two or more races. Hispanic or Latino of any race were 6.3% of the population.

There were 176 households, of which 35.2% had children under the age of 18 living with them, 44.9% were married couples living together, 6.8% had a female householder with no husband present, 10.2% had a male householder with no wife present, and 38.1% were non-families. 31.8% of all households were made up of individuals, and 9.1% had someone living alone who was 65 years of age or older. The average household size was 2.36 and the average family size was 2.95.

The median age in the city was 35.1 years. 26.4% of residents were under the age of 18; 5.6% were between the ages of 18 and 24; 29.6% were from 25 to 44; 27.4% were from 45 to 64; and 11.1% were 65 years of age or older. The gender makeup of the city was 51.9% male and 48.1% female.

2000 census

As of the census of 2000, there were 395 people, 162 households, and 115 families residing in the city. The racial makeup of the city was 97.97% White, 0.51% Native American, 0.25% from other races, and 1.27% from two or more races. Hispanic or Latino of any race were 6.08% of the population.

There were 162 households, out of which 33.3% had children under the age of 18 living with them, 60.5% were married couples living together, 6.8% had a female householder with no husband present, and 29.0% were non-families. 25.3% of all households were made up of individuals, and 11.1% had someone living alone who was 65 years of age or older. The average household size was 2.44 and the average family size was 2.92.

In the city, the population was spread out, with 25.6% under the age of 18, 7.3% from 18 to 24, 27.1% from 25 to 44, 27.6% from 45 to 64, and 12.4% who were 65 years of age or older. The median age was 39 years. For every 100 females, there were 96.5 males. For every 100 females age 18 and over, there were 94.7 males.

The median income for a household in the city was $31,167, and the median income for a family was $33,750. Males had a median income of $26,607 versus $16,667 for females. The per capita income for the city was $21,504. About 9.1% of families and 10.7% of the population were below the poverty line, including 6.7% of those under age 18 and 18.0% of those age 65 or over.

Transportation

Fairfield's main street is Soldier Road but is accessed by U.S. Route 20, a two-lane undivided highway connecting it to the west with Interstate 84 near Mountain Home, and to the east with State Highway 75 at Timmerman Junction in Blaine County. Four miles (6.4 km) east of Fairfield, State Highway 46 begins and proceeds south to Gooding.

Education
The public schools are operated by Camas County School District #121, headquartered in Fairfield. Camas County High School is the district's flagship school, located on Soldier Road in central Fairfield.

Recreation
The Soldier Mountains and Smoky Mountains of the Sawtooth National Forest (Fairfield Ranger District) are north of the village, offering many outdoor recreational opportunities. The Sun Valley ski resort is approximately 45 highway miles (70 km) northeast, up the Big Wood River Valley along State Highway 75, the Sawtooth Scenic Byway.

Climate
Fairfield experiences a continental climate (Köppen Dsb) with cold, snowy winters and hot, dry summers.

In Popular Culture
The city was featured in a season two episode of The X-Files entitled "Fearful Symmetry", in which an investigation at a fictitious zoo takes place. While the episode is set in Fairfield, it was, like many in the series, filmed in British Columbia, Canada.

See also
 List of cities in Idaho

References

External links

  
 Fairfield Idaho.net 
 Camas County School District #121

Cities in Camas County, Idaho
Cities in Idaho
County seats in Idaho